San Gennaro Vesuviano is a comune and town located in the Metropolitan City of Naples, Campania, in southern Italy.

Geography 
San Gennaro Vesuviano is located in the country-side area around Nola (the so-called “agro Nolano") approximately 25 kilometers east of Naples and nine kilometers from Nola.

History

Ancient history
The comune of San Gennaro Vesuviano is positioned in the site of the Pianura Campana (the Campania Plain – once named the Planum Palmae), surrounded by the Vesuvius and Monte Sant’Angelo.

Archeological findings date early settlements back to the Bronze Age, around 2000 BC, when a sudden eruption of the Vesuvius wiped out the ancient communities settled in the area. Only several centuries later did new settlers repopulate the area.

17th century 
The area remained uninhabited until 1631, when the Count of San Valentino and Marquis of Lauro donated it to the monastic Order of Friars Minor, who built here a convent; the   inhabited center which grew around it was initially a neighbourhood of Palma Campania and later a self-governing entity by decree of King Ferdinand II of Two Sicilies. The Marquis also established the local Fair which is held every year in name of Saint Januarius

Nazi occupation and Allies arrival
During the Nazi occupation, a young man was executed by Nazi soldiers because he was found outside during curfew. Several livestock were seized by the German armed forces and consequently killed. The area of Pozzo Pagnotti was bombed by USA forces while a British fighter plane was taken down and fell near Via Musiello, killing the pilot.

On 9 September the Allies arrived in Salerno and on the 28th the English forces reached San Gennaro Vesuviano. The men were those from the 46th Infantry Division under the command of Major-General John Hawkesworth. A group of local inhabitants went to meet the newly arrived English forces, warning them about the location of land mines previously placed around the area by German forces.

Economy 
 
Nowadays, San Gennaro Vesuviano belongs to a larger industrial district which consists of a territorial consortium of small businesses with a discernible specialization in the general manufacturing industry. Activities include mostly food processing.
 
Despite the  overpopulation, agriculture is still performed by  local farmers and small landowners: activities include hazelnut, grain and tobacco growing (nicotina tabacum: indigenous of North-America) as well as vineyards   Pig and cow breeding are not relevant industries. There are several specialized horse breeders.

Transportation
San Gennaro is connected to the A30 Caserta-Salerno highway both through the Palma Campania junction and the SS-268 (a state-run toll-free road).

It is also served by RFI station Palma-San Gennaro.

Churches and Monuments
Catholic Church of the Franciscans Convent
Catholic Church od Saints Joachim and Anna
Giugliani Chapel
Sommesi Chapel
Kingdom Hall of Jehovah Witnesses

Franciscan Convent (dated ca 1600). 
Memorial for the fallen soldiers 
Padre Pio statue

References

History of the Camorra in Italy
San Gennaro Vesuviano